This is a list of automobiles produced for the general public in the European market. They are listed in chronological order from when each model began its model year. If a model did not have continuous production, it is listed again on the model year production resumed. Concept cars and submodels are not listed unless they are themselves notable.

1906
 Lagonda 20 (1906-1913)

1908
 Lancia Alfa 12 HP (1908)
 Lancia 18/24 HP Dialfa (1908)

1909
 Lancia 15/20 HP Beta (1909)

1910
 Bugatti Type 13 (1910-1913)
 Lancia 20 HP Gamma (1910)

1911
 Lagonda 30 (1911-1913)
 Lancia 20-30 HP Delta (1911)
 Lancia 20/30 HP Epsilon (1911-1912)
 Lancia Eta 30/50 HP (1911-1914)

1912
 Bugatti Type 18 (1912-1914)
 Lancia 12 HP Zeta (1912-1914)

1913
 Lagonda 11 (1913-1921)
 Lancia 25/35 HP Theta (1913-1918)

1919
 Bugatti Type 13 (1919-1920)
 Lancia Kappa (1919) (1919-1922)

1920
 Lagonda 11.9 (1920-1923)

1921
 Lancia Dikappa (1921-1922)

1922
 Bugatti Type 30 (1922-1926)
 Lancia Lambda (1922-1931)
 Lancia Trikappa (1922-1925)

1923
 Lagonda 12 (1923-1926)
 Lagonda 12/24 (1923-1926)

1925
 Lagonda 14/60 (1925-1933)

1926
 Bugatti Type 38 (1926-1927)
 Bugatti Type 40 (1926-1930)
 Lagonda 16/65 (1926-1930)

1927
 Bugatti Royale (1927-1933)
 Bugatti Type 43 (1927-1931)
 Bugatti Type 44 (1927-1930)

1928
 Lagonda 3-litre (1928-1934)
 Lancia Dilambda (1928-1935)

1929
 Bugatti Type 46 (1929-1936)

1930
 Bugatti Type 46S (1930)
 Bugatti Type 49 (1930-1934)
 Bugatti Type 50T (1930-1934)

1931
 Bugatti Type 43A Roadster (1931-1932)
 Bugatti Type 55 (1931-1935)
 Lancia Artena (1931-1936)
 Lancia Astura (1931-1939)
 SS 1 (1931-1936)

1932
 Lagonda 16/80 (1932-1934)

1933
 Lancia Augusta (1933-1936)

1934
 Bugatti Type 57 (1934-1940)
 Lagonda Rapier (1934-1938)
 Lancia Belna (1934-1938)

1935
 Lagonda 3.5-litre (1935)
 Lagonda M45 (1935)
 Peugeot 402 (1935-1942)
 SS 90 (1935)
 SS 1½ Litre (1935-1940)
 SS 2½ Litre (1935-1940)

1936
 Lagonda LG45 (1936-1937)
 SS Jaguar 100 (1936-1937)

1937
 Bugatti Type 50B (1937-1939)
 SS 3½ Litre (1937-1940)
 Lagonda LG6 (1937-1940)
 Lancia Aprilia (1937-1949)

1938
 Lagonda V12 (1938-1940)
 Peugeot 202 (1938-1942)

1939
 Lancia Ardea (1939-1953)

1940
 Jaguar 1½ Litre (1940-1949)
 Jaguar 2½ Litre (1940-1948)
 Jaguar 3½ Litre (1940-1948)
 Lancia Artena (1940-1942)

1945
 Peugeot 202 (1945-1948)

1947
 Ferrari 125 S (1947)
 Ferrari 159 S (1947)
 Maserati A6 1500 (1947-1950)
 Chenard-Walcker CPV (1947-1950)

1948
 Aston Martin DB1 (1948-1950)
 Ferrari 166 Inter (1948-1950)
 Ferrari 166 S (1948-1953)
 Jaguar Mark V (1948-1951)
 Jaguar XK120 (1948-1954)
 Lagonda 2.6-Litre (1948-1953)
 Peugeot 203 (1948-1960)
 Porsche 356 (1948-1955)

1949
 Saab 92 (1949-1955)

1950
 Aston Martin DB2 (1950-1953)
 Ferrari 195 Inter (1950-1951)
 Ferrari 195 S (1950)
 Ferrari 275 S (1950)
 Ferrari 340 America (1950-1952)
 Jaguar Mark VII (1950-1954)
 Lancia Aurelia (1950-1958)
 Maserati A6G 2000 (1950-1951)
 Peugeot D3 and D4 (1950-1965)

1951
 Bugatti Type 101 (1951-1965)
 Ferrari 212 Export (1951-1952)
 Ferrari 212 Inter (1951-1952)
 Fiat Campagnola (1951-1973)
 Jaguar C-Type (1951-1953)
 Maserati A6GCM (1951-1953)

1952
 Ferrari 225 S (1952)
 Ferrari 250 MM (1952-1954)
 Ferrari 250 S (1952)
 Ferrari 340 Mexico (1952)
 Ferrari 340 MM (1952-1953)
 Ferrari 342 America (1952)
 Lotus Mark VI (1952-1957)

1953
 Aston Martin DB2/4 (1953-1955)
 Ferrari 250 Europa (1953)
 Ferrari 375 America (1953-1954)
 Ferrari 375 MM (1953-1955)
 Lagonda 3-Litre (1953-1958)
 Lancia Appia (1953-1963)
 Maserati A6GCS (1953-1955)

1954
 Ferrari 250 Europa GT (1954-1955)
 Ferrari 250 Monza (1954)
 Ferrari 375 Plus (1954)
 Jaguar D-Type (1954-1957)
 Jaguar Mark VII M (1954-1956)
 Jaguar XK140 (1954-1957)
 Maserati A6G/54 (1954-1956)

1955
 Aston Martin DB2/4 Mark II (1955-1957)
 Ferrari 410 S (1955-1956)
 Ferrari 410 Superamerica (1955-1959)
 Jaguar Mark 1 (1955-1959)
 Peugeot 403 (1955-1966)
 Porsche 356 A (1955-1959)
 Saab Sonett I (1955-1957)

1956
 Ferrari 250 GT Boano (1956)
 Ferrari 250 GT "Tour de France" (1956-1958)
 Ferrari 290 MM (1956)
 Jaguar Mark VIII (1956-1958)
 Saab 93 (1956-1960)
 TVR Open Sports (1956)
 TVR Coupe (1956-1958)

1957
 Aston Martin DB Mark III (1957-1959)
 Bugatti Type 252 (1957-1962)
 Ferrari 250 GT Cabriolet (1957-1962)
 Ferrari 250 GT California Spyder (1957-1962)
 Ferrari 250 GT Ellena (1957)
 Ferrari 250 Testa Rossa (1957-1961)
 Ferrari 290 S (1957)
 Ferrari 315 S (1957)
 Ferrari 335 S (1957-1958)
 Jaguar XK150 (1957-1961)
 Jaguar XKSS (1957)
 Lancia Flaminia (1957-1970)
 Lotus Seven (1957-1973)
 Maserati 3500 GT (1957-1964)

1958
 Aston Martin DB4 (1958-1963)
 Ferrari 250 GT Coupé Pinin Farina (1958-1960)
 Jaguar Mark IX (1958-1961)
 Lotus Elite Type 14 (1958-1963)
 Saab GT750 (1958-1960)
 TVR Grantura Series I (1958-1960)

1959
 Ferrari 250 GT "SWB" (1959-1961)
 Ferrari 400 Superamerica (1959-1964)
 Jaguar Mark 2 (1959-1967)
 Maserati 5000 GT (1959-1965)
 Saab 95 (1959-1978)

1960
 Aston Martin DB4 GT Zagato (1960-1963)
 Ferrari 250 GT/E (1960-1962)
 Peugeot 404 (1960-1969)
 Porsche 356 B (1960-1963)
 Saab 96 (1960-1980)
 TVR Grantura Series II (1960-1962)

1961
 Jaguar E-Type Series 1 (1961-1968)
 Jaguar Mark X 3.8 Litre (1961-1965)
 Jaguar Mark X 4.2 Litre (1961-1964)
 Lagonda Rapide (1961-1964)
 Lancia Flavia (1961-1971)

1962
 Ferrari 250 GTO (1962-1964)
 Lotus Elan S1-S4/Sprint (1962-1973)
 Maserati Sebring Series I (1962-1965)
 Saab Sport (1962-1968)
 TVR Grantura Series III (1962-1967)

1963
 Aston Martin DB5 (1963-1965)
 Ferrari 250 LM (1963-1965)
 Jaguar Lightweight E-Type (1963-1964)
 Jaguar S-Type (1963-1968)
 Lancia Fulvia Berlina I (1963-1969)
 Lotus Cortina (1963-1966)
 Maserati Mistral (1963-1970)
 Maserati Quattroporte Series I (1963-1966)

1964

 De Tomaso Vallelunga (1964-1968)
 Ferrari 500 Superfast (1964-1966)
 Lamborghini 350 GT (1964-1966)
 Porsche 356 C (1964-1965)
 Porsche 911 O/A/B (1964-1969)

1965
 Aston Martin DB6 (1965-1970)
 Aston Martin Short Chassis Volante (1965-1966)
 Audi 72 (1965-1969)
 Bizzarrini Strada (1965-1968)
 Lancia Fulvia Coupé I (1965-1970)
 Lancia Fulvia Sport I (1965-1969)
 Maserati Sebring Series II (1965-1969)
 Peugeot 204 (1965-1976)
 Peugeot J7 (1965-1980)
 Porsche 912 (1965-1969)

1966

 Audi 80 (1966-1969)
 Audi Super 90 (1966-1972)
 Bizzarrini Europa (1966-1969)
 Bizzarrini P538 (1966)
 Daimler Sovereign (1966-1969)
 Ferrari 365 California (1966-1967)
 Jaguar 420 (1966-1968) 
 Jaguar 420G (1966-1970)
 Jaguar XJ13 (1966)
 Lamborghini 400 GT (1966-1968)
 Lamborghini Miura P400 (1966-1969)
 Lotus Cortina Mk2 (1966-1970)
 Lotus Elan +2 (1967-1975)
 Lotus Europa (1966-1975)
 Maserati Mexico (1966-1972)
 Maserati Quattroporte Series II (1966-1969)
 Saab Sonett II (1966-1969)

1967
 Aston Martin DBS (1967-1972)
 De Tomaso Mangusta (1967-1971)
 Jaguar 240 (1967-1969)
 Jaguar 340 (1967-1969)
 Maserati Ghibli (AM115) (1967-1973)
 TVR Tuscan (1967-1971)
 TVR Tuscan V8 (1967-1970)
 TVR Vixen (1967-1973)

1968
 Audi 60 (1968-1972)
 Daimler DS420 (1968-1992)
 Jaguar E-Type Series 2 (1968-1971)
 Jaguar XJ Series 1 (1968-1973)
 Lamborghini Espada Series I (1968-1969)
 Lamborghini Islero (1968)
 Lamborghini Miura P400S (1968-1971)
 Peugeot 504 (1968-1973)

1969
 Aston Martin DBS V8 (1969-1972)
 Audi 75 (1969-1972)
 Audi 100 Coupé S (1969-1971)
 Autobianchi-Lancia A112 (1969-1973)
 Lamborghini Islero S (1969)
 Lancia Fulvia Berlina II (1969-1972)
 Maserati Indy (1969-1975)
 Peugeot 304 (1969-1980)
 Porsche 911 C/D (1969-1971)
 Porsche 914 (1969-1976)
 TVR Tuscan V6 (1969-1971)

1970
 Lamborghini Espada Series II (1970-1971)
 Lamborghini Jarama (1970-1973)
 Lancia Fulvia Coupé II (1970-1976)
 Lancia Fulvia Sport II (1970-1972)
 Peugeot 404 (1970-1972)
 Saab 99 E (1970-1984)
 Saab Sonett III (1970-1974)

1971
 Autobianchi-Lancia A112 Abarth (1971-1976)
 De Tomaso Deauville (1971-1985)
 De Tomaso Pantera (1971-1992)
 Jaguar E-Type Series 3 (1971-1975)
 Lamborghini Miura P400SV (1971)
 Lancia 2000 (1971-1975)
 Lancia 2000 Coupé (1971-1975)
 Maserati Bora 4.7 (1971-1978)
 Porsche 911 E/F (1971-1973)

1972
 Aston Martin Vantage (1972-1973)
 Audi 80 B1 (1972-1978)
 Audi 100 Coupé S (1972-1976)
 De Tomaso Longchamp (1972-1989)
 Lamborghini Espada Series III (1972-1978)
 Lamborghini Jarama S (1972-1976)
 Lancia 2000 i.e. (1972-1975)
 Lancia Beta Berlina (1972-1981)
 Maserati Merak (1972-1974)
 Peugeot 104 (1972-1976)
 Saab 99 EMS (1972-1984)
 TVR M series (1972-1979)

1973
 Aston Martin V8 Series 3 (1973-1978)
 Autobianchi-Lancia A112 (1973-1975)
 Jaguar XJ Series 2 (1973-1979)
 Lamborghini Urraco (1973-1979)
 Lancia Beta Coupe (1973-1984)
 Lancia Stratos (1973-1978)
 Maserati Bora 4.9 (1973-1978)
 Peugeot 404 (1973-1975)
 Peugeot 504 (1973-1983)
 Porsche 911 Carrera RS (1973-1974)
 Saab 99 L (1973-1984)
 Saab 99 X7 (1973-1984)

1974
 Aston Martin Lagonda Series 1 (1974-1975)
 Audi 50 (1974-1978)
 Fiat Nuova Campagnola (1974-1987)
 Lamborghini Countach LP400 (1974-1977)
 Lotus Elite Type 75 (1974-1982)
 Lotus Elite Type 83 (1974-1982)
 Maserati Khamsin (1974-1982)
 Porsche 911 G/H/I/J (1974-1977)
 Volvo 200 Series (1974-1982)

1975
 Autobianchi-Lancia A112 (1975-1977)
 Jaguar XJ-Coupé (1975-1978)
 Jaguar XJ-S Series I (1975-1981)
 Lancia Beta HPE (1975-1984)
 Lancia Beta Spyder (1975-1983)
 Lancia Beta Montecarlo (1975-1978)
 Lotus Eclat Series 1 (1975-1980)
 Peugeot 604 (1975-1985)
 Porsche 911 Turbo 3.0 (1975-1977)
 Saab 99 GL (1975-1984)
 Volvo 66 (1975-1980)

1976
 Aston Martin Lagonda Series 2 (1976-1985)
 Lamborghini Silhouette (1976-1979)
 Lancia Gamma (1976-1984)
 Lotus Esprit S1 (1976-1978)
 Maserati Kyalami (1976-1983)
 Maserati Merak SS (1976-1983)
 Maserati Quattroporte II (1976-1978)
 Peugeot 104 (1976-1978)
 Porsche 911 Carrera 3.0 (1976-1977)
 Porsche 912E (1976)
 Porsche 924 (1976-1985)
 Volvo 300 Series (1976-1981)

1977
 Aston Martin V8 Vantage (1977-1989)
 Autobianchi-Lancia A112 (1977-1979)
 Autobianchi-Lancia Campionato A112 Abarth (1977-1984)
 Fiat Fiorino 147 (1977-1988)
 Maserati Merak 2000 GT (1977-1983)
 Peugeot 305 (1977-1989)
 Saab 99 Finlandia (1977-1983)
 Saab 99 Turbo (1977-1984)
 Volvo 262C (1977-1981)

1978
 Aston Martin V8 Series 4 Oscar India (1978-1985)
 Audi 80 B2 (1978-1986)
 Iveco Daily (1978-1990)
 Lamborghini Countach LP400 S (1978-1981)
 Lotus Esprit S2 (1978-1981)
 Peugeot 104 (1978-1980)
 Porsche 911 SC (1978-1983)
 Porsche 911 Turbo 3.3 (1978-1989)
 Porsche 928 (1978-1982)
 Saab 900 Classic (1978-1987)

1979
 Autobianchi-Lancia A112 (1979-1982)
 Jaguar XJ Series 3 (1979-1992)
 Lancia Delta (1979-1982)
 Maserati Quattroporte III (1979-1987)
 Peugeot 104 ZS 2 (1979)
 Peugeot 505 (1979-1990)
 Porsche 924 Turbo (1979-1983)
 Saab 99 Petro (1979-1981)

1980
 Audi Coupé (B2) (1980-1983)
 Audi Quattro A1/A2 (1980-1983)
 Lancia Beta Trevi (1980-1983)
 Lancia Montecarlo (1980-1981)
 Lotus Eclat Series 2 (1980-1982)
 Peugeot 104 (1980-1982)
 Porsche 924 Carrera GT (1980)
 Porsche 928 S (1980-1983)
 TVR Tasmin (1980-1984)

1981
 Alfa Romeo AR6 (1981-1986)
 Citroën C25 (1981-1993)
 Fiat Ducato (1981-1993)
 Jaguar XJ-S Series II (1981-1991)
 Lamborghini Jalpa (1981-1988)
 Lotus Eclat S 2.2 Riviera Type 84 (1981-1982)
 Lotus Esprit S3 (1981-1987)
 Lotus Turbo Esprit (1981-1987)
 Maserati Biturbo (1981-1988)
 Peugeot J5 (1981-1993)
 Peugeot J9 (1981-1991)
 TVR Tasmin 200 (1981-1984)
 Volvo 300 Series (1981-1985)

1982
 Autobianchi-Lancia A112 (1982-1984)
 Lamborghini Countach LP500 S (1982-1984)
 Lancia Delta (1982-1986)
 Lancia 037 Stradale (1982-1984)
 Lotus Eclat Excel (1982-1986)
 Peugeot 104 (1982-1983)
 Porsche 944 (1982-1989)
 Talbot Express (1982-1994)
 Volvo 760 (1982-1990)

1983
 Lancia Delta HF (1983-1985)
 Lancia Trevi (1983-1984)
 Maserati 425 (1983-1986)
 Peugeot 104 (1983-1988)
 Peugeot 205 (1983-1990)
 TVR 350i (1983-1989)
 Volvo 200 Series (1983-1993)

1984
 Autobianchi-Lancia A112 (1984-1985)
 Audi Coupé (B2) (1984-1985)
 Audi Sport Quattro (1984)
 Peugeot 205 Turbo 16 (1984-1986)
 Porsche 911 3.2 Carrera (1984-1989)
 Porsche 928 S2 (1984-1986)
 Saab 90 (1984-1987)
 Saab 9000 (1984-1993)
 Saab-Lancia 600 (1984-1987)
 TVR 280i (1984-1987)
 TVR 390SE (1984-1988)
 Volvo 740 (1984-1994)

1985
 Audi Sport Quattro S1 (1985-1986)
 Autobianchi-Lancia Y10 (1985-1986)
 Lamborghini Countach LP500 Quattrovalvole (1985-1987)
 Lancia Delta HF Turbo (1985-1986)
 Lancia Delta S4 (1985-1986)
 Lotus Excel S.E. (1985-1992)
 Maserati 420 (1985-1986)
 Maserati 420 i (1985-1987)
 Maserati 420 S (1985-1986)
 Maserati 420 Si (1985-1987)
 Peugeot 309 I (1985-1989)
 Porsche 944 Turbo (1985-1991)
 Saab 9000 Turbo (1985-1993)
 Volvo 300 Series (1985-1991)

1986
 Aston Martin Lagonda Series 3 (1986-1987)
 Aston Martin V8 Vantage 580 X-Pack (1986-1989)
 Aston Martin V8 Zagato (1986-1990)
 Audi 80 B3 (1986-1991)
 Audi Coupé GT (1986-1988)
 Audi Ur-Quattro (1986-1991)
 Jaguar XJ (XJ40) (1986-1994)
 Lamborghini LM002 (1986-1993)
 Lancia Delta (1986-1991)
 Lancia Delta HF 4WD (1986-1988)
 Lotus Excel S.A. (1986-1992)
 Maserati 228 (1986-1992)
 Maserati 425 i (1986-1989)
 Maserati 430 (1986-1994)
 Porsche 924S (1986-1988)
 Porsche 959 (1986-1988)
 TVR 420SE (1986-1987)
 TVR 420 SEAC (1986-1988)
 TVR S Series (1986-1994)
 Volvo 480 (1986-1995)
 Volvo 780 (1986-1990)

1987
 Aston Martin Lagonda Series 4 (1987-1990)
 Lancia Delta HF Integrale 8v (1987-1989)
 Lotus Esprit Turbo (1987-1990)
 Lotus Esprit X180 (1987-1993)
 Maserati Royale (1987-1990)
 Peugeot 405 (1987-1997)
 Porsche 928 S4 (1987-1991)
 Porsche 944 S (1987-1989)
 Saab 900 Classic (1987-1994)
 Volvo 440/460 (1987-1994)

1988
 Audi V8 4C (1988-1993)
 Fiat Fiorino 146 (1988-2001)
 Lamborghini Countach 25th Anniversary Edition (1988-1990)
 Maserati 2.24v (1988-1993)
 Maserati 222 (1988-1994)
 Maserati 422 (1988-1992)
 Maserati Karif (1988-1991)
 Porsche 928 CS (1988-1989)
 Porsche 928 SE (1988)
 Porsche 944 Turbo S (1988)
 Porsche 959S (1988)
 TVR 400SE (1988-1991)
 TVR 450 SEAC (1988-1989)
 Volvo 480 Turbo (1988-1995)

1989
 Aston Martin Virage (1989-2000)
 Autobianchi-Lancia Y10 (1989-1992)
 Lancia Delta HF Integrale 16v (1989-1992)
 Lotus Elan M100 (1989-1995)
 Peugeot 309 II (1989-1994)
 Peugeot 605 (1989-1995)
 Porsche 928 GT (1989-1991)
 Porsche 944 S2 (1989-1991)
 Porsche 964 (1989-1994)
 TVR 450SE (1989-1990)

1990
 Iveco Daily (1990-2000)
 Jaguar XJR-15 (1990-1992)
 Lamborghini Diablo (1990-1998)
 Lotus Carlton (1990-1992)
 Maserati 4.24v (1990-1992)
 Maserati Shamal (1990-1996)
 Peugeot 205 (1990-1998)
 Porsche 964 Turbo (1990-1994)
 Saab 9000 2.3i-16 (1990-1995)
 TVR 350SE (1990-1991)
 Volvo 940 (1990-1998)
 Volvo 960 (1990-1998)

1991
 Audi 80 B4 (1991-1996)
 Audi S2 (1991-1995)
 Audi S4 (1991-1994)
 Bugatti EB 110 (1991-1995)
 Cizeta-Moroder V16T (1991-1995)
 Jaguar XJ-S Series III (1991-1996)
 Lancia Delta (1991-1993)
 Lancia Delta HF Integrale Evoluzione (1991-1992)
 Maserati 4.24v II (1991-1993)
 Maserati 430 4v (1991-1994)
 Maserati Racing (1991-1992)
 Peugeot 106 I (1991-1996)
 Saab 9000 2.3T (1991-1998)
 TVR Griffith (1991-2002)
 Volvo 850 (1991-1996)

1992
 Aston Martin Virage Volante (1992-1996)
 Autobianchi-Lancia Y10 (1992-1995)
 Jaguar XJ220 (1992-1994)
 Lancia Hyena (1992-1996)
 Maserati Ghibli (AM336) (1992-1998)
 McLaren F1 (1992-1998)
 Porsche 928 GTS (1992-1995)
 Porsche 959 Komfort (1992-1993)
 Porsche 964 Speedster (1992-1994)
 Porsche 968 (1992-1995)
 Porsche 968 Turbo RS (1992-1994)
 Saab 9000 2.3 Turbo Carlsson/Talladega (1992)
 TVR Chimaera (1992-2003)

1993
 Aston Martin V8 Vantage (1993-1999)
 Fiat Ducato (1993-2006)
 Lancia Delta (1993-1999)
 Lancia Delta HF Integrale Evoluzione II (1993)
 Lister Storm (1993-1994)
 Lotus Esprit S4 (1993-2004)
 Peugeot 306 I (1993-1997)
 Porsche 911 30th Anniversary C4 (1993)
 Porsche 968 Clubsport (1993-1995)
 Porsche 968 Turbo S (1993)
 Porsche 993 GT2 (1993-1998)
 Saab 9000 2.3 Turbo Aero (1993-1997)

1994
 Aston Martin DB7 (1994-1999)
 Audi A4 B5 (1994-1999)
 Audi A6 C4 (1994-1997)
 Audi A8 D2 (1994-2002)
 Audi RS 2 Avant (1994-1995)
 Audi S6 C4 (1994-1997)
 Citroën Jumper (1994-2006)
 Citroën Jumpy Mk1 (1994-2006)
 De Tomaso Guarà (1994-2004)
 Eurovans (1994-2002)
 Jaguar XJ (X300) (1994-1997)
 Koenigsegg CC (1994-2000)
 Lancia Kappa (1994-2000)
 Lancia Zeta (1994-2001)
 Maserati Quattroporte IV (1994-2001)
 Peugeot Boxer (1994-2006)
 Porsche 993 (1994-1998)
 Saab 900 NG (1994-1998)
 Saab 9000 2.0i-16 (1994-1996)
 Saab 9000 2.0T (Aero) (1994-1998)
 Saab 9000 GM V6 (1994-1997)
 Volvo 440/460 (1994-1996)

1995
 Lancia Ypsilon 840 (1995-2003)
 McLaren F1 LM (1995)
 Peugeot 406 (1995-2004)
 Peugeot 605 (1995-1999)
 Peugeot Expert (1995-2006)
 Porsche 993 Turbo (1995-1998)
 Volvo S40 (1995-2004)

1996
 Audi A3 (1996-1998)
 Audi S8 D2 (1996-2002)
 Citroën Berlingo I (1996-2013)
 Fiat Scudo (1996-2006)
 Jaguar XK8 (1996-2006)
 Lotus Elise Series 1 (1996-2001)
 Lotus Esprit V8 (1996-2004)
 Peugeot 106 II (1996-2003)
 Porsche 911 GT1 Straßenversion (1996-1998)
 Porsche 986 Boxster (1996-2004)
 TVR Cerbera (1996-2003)
 Volvo C70 (1996-2005)
 Volvo S70 (1996-2000)
 Volvo V70 (1996-2000)

1997
 Aston Martin V8 Volante (1997-2000)
 Audi A6 C5 (1997-2004)
 Audi S4 (1997-2001)
 Jaguar XJ (X308) (1997-2002)
 Peugeot 306 II (1997-1999)
 Peugeot Partner (1997-2013)
 Porsche 993 Turbo S (1997-1998)
 Porsche 996 (1997-2004)
 Saab 9-5 YSE Sedan (1997-2004)

1998
 Audi TT 8N (1998-2006)
 Citroën Berlingo électrique (1998-2005)
 Lamborghini Diablo (1998-2001)
 Maserati 3200 GT (1998-2002)
 Peugeot 206 (1998-2009)
 Saab 9-3 (1998-2003)
 Saab 9-5 YSE Wagon (1998-2004)
 Volvo S80 (1998-2006)

1999
 Aston Martin DB7 V12 Vantage (1999-2003)
 Aston Martin V8 Vantage Le Mans V600 (1999-2000)
 Audi A2 (1999-2000)
 Audi A4 B5 (1999-2001)
 Audi RS 4 B5 (1999-2001)
 Audi S3 (1999-2003)
 Audi S6 C5 (1999-2003)
 Qvale Mangusta (1999-2002)
 Jaguar S-Type (1999-2007)
 Lancia Lybra (1999-2005)
 Pagani Zonda C12 (1999)
 Peugeot 306 III (1999-2002)
 Peugeot 607 (1999-2004)
 Porsche 996 GT3 (1999-2005)
 Porsche 996 Turbo (1999-2006)
 TVR Tuscan Speed Six (1999-2006)
 Ultima GTR (1999-2015)

2000
 Audi A2 (2000-2001)
 Iveco Daily (2000-2006)
 Lotus 340R (2000)
 Lotus Exige Series 1 (2000-2002)
 Pagani Zonda C12 S (2000)
 TVR Typhon (2000-2006)
 Volvo S60 (2000-2009)
 Volvo V70 (2000-2007)

2001
 Aston Martin V12 Vanquish (2001-2005)
 Audi A4 B6 (2001-2006)
 Jaguar X-Type (2001-2007)
 Lamborghini Murciélago (2001-2006)
 Lotus Elise Series 2 (2001-2011)
 Maserati Coupé (2001-2007)
 Maserati Spyder (2001-2007)
 Peugeot 307 (2001-2005)
 Porsche 996 GT2 (2001-2005)

2002
 Aston Martin DB7 V12 GTA (2002-2003)
 Aston Martin DB7 V12 GT (2002-2003)
 Audi A2 (2002-2003)
 Audi A2 S-line (2002)
 Audi A8 D3 (2002-2009)
 Audi RS 6 C5 (2002-2004)
 Eurovans (2002-2014)
 Jaguar XJ (X350) (2002-2007)
 Koenigsegg CC8S (2002-2004)
 Lancia Phedra (2002-2010)
 Pagani Zonda S (2002)
 Porsche Cayenne 9PA (2002-2010)
 TVR T350 (2002-2006)
 TVR Tamora (2002-2006)
 Volvo XC90 (2002-2014)

2003
 Aston Martin DB AR1 (2003)
 Aston Martin DB7 Vantage Zagato (2003)
 Audi A2 (2003-2004)
 Audi A3 (2003-2004)
 Audi S4 (2003-2005)
 Lamborghini Gallardo (2003-2008)
 Lancia Ypsilon 843 (2003-2011)
 Maserati Quattroporte V (2003-2012)
 Mercedes-Benz SLR McLaren (2003-2010)
 Pagani Zonda Roadster (2003)
 Peugeot 407 (2003-2010)
 Porsche Carrera GT (2003-2007)
 Saab 9-3 (2003-2008)

2004
 Aston Martin DB9 (2004-2007)
 Aston Martin V12 Vanquish S (2004-2007)
 Audi A3 Sportback (2004-2012)
 Audi A4 B7 (2004-2009)
 Audi A6 C6 (2004-2011)
 Audi S4 (2004-2008)
 Koenigsegg CCR (2004-2006)
 Lamborghini Murciélago 40th Anniversary Edition (2004)
 Lancia Musa (2004-2007)
 Lotus Exige Series 2 (2004-2006)
 Maserati GranSport (2004-2007)
 Maserati MC12 (2004-2005)
 Peugeot 607 (2004-2010)
 Porsche 550 Spyder 50th Anniversary Edition (2004)
 Porsche 987 Boxster (2004-2012)
 Porsche 997 (2004-2008)
 Saab 9-5 YSE Sedan (2004-2007)
 Saab 9-5 YSE Wagon (2004-2007)
 Saab 9-7X (2004-2008)
 Volvo S40 (2004-2012)
 Volvo V50 (2004-2012)

2005
 Aston Martin V8 Vantage (2005-2008)
 Audi A2 (2005)
 Audi A2 Special Edition (2005)
 Audi Q7 (2005-2009)
 Audi TT quattro Sport (2005)
 Bugatti Veyron 16.4 (2005-2011)
 Pagani Zonda F (2005)
 Peugeot 107 (2005-2009)
 Peugeot 307 (2005-2008)
 Peugeot 1007 (2005-2009)
 Porsche 996 Turbo S (2005-2006)
 TVR Sagaris (2005-2006)

2006
 Audi R8 Coupé 4.2 FSI quattro (2006-2012)
 Audi RS 4 B7 (2006-2008)
 Audi S3 (2006-2012)
 Audi S6 C6 (2006-2011)
 Audi S8 D3 (2006-2010)
 Audi TT AJ (2006-2014)
 Fiat Ducato (2006–present)
 Iveco Daily (2006-2011)
 Jaguar XK (2006-2011)
 Koenigsegg CCX (2006-2010)
 Lamborghini Murciélago LP 640 (2006-2010)
 Lotus Europa S (2006-2010)
 Lotus Exige S (2006-2011)
 Pagani Zonda F Clubsport (2006)
 Pagani Zonda Roadster F (2006)
 Peugeot 207 (2006-2014)
 Porsche 997 GT3 (2006-2011)
 Porsche Cayman 987 (2006-2012)
 Volvo C30 (2006-2013)
 Volvo C70 (2006-2013)
 Volvo S80 (2006-2016)

2007
 Aston Martin DBS V12 (2007-2012)
 Audi A4 B8 (2007-2012)
 Audi A5 (2007-2016)
 Audi S5 B8 (2007-2012)
 Citroën Jumper (2007–present)
 Citroën Jumpy Mk2 (2007-2016)
 Fiat Fiorino 225 (2007–present)
 Fiat Scudo (2007-2011)
 Jaguar XF (2007-2011)
 Jaguar XJ (X358) (2007-2009)
 Jaguar X-Type (2007-2009)
 Lamborghini Reventón (2007-2009)
 Lancia Musa (2007-2012)
 Lotus 2-Eleven (2007-2011)
 Maserati GranTurismo (2007-2019)
 Peugeot 308 T7 (2007-2011)
 Peugeot 4007 (2007-2012)
 Peugeot Boxer (2007–present)
 Peugeot Expert (2007-2016)
 Porsche 997 GT2 (2007-2012)
 Saab 9-5 YSE Sedan (2007-2009)
 Saab 9-5 YSE Wagon (2007-2009)
 Volvo V70 (2007-2016)

2008
 Aston Martin DB9 (2008-2012)
 Aston Martin V8 Vantage (2008-2011)
 Audi Q5 (2008-2012)
 Audi Q7 V12 TDi (2008-2012)
 Audi RS 6 C6 (2008-2011)
 Audi S4 (2008-2016)
 Citroën Berlingo II (2008-2018)
 Lamborghini Gallardo LP 560-4 (2008-2009)
 Lancia Delta (2008-2014)
 Maserati GranTurismo S (2008-2012)
 Peugeot 3008 I (2008-2016)
 Peugeot Bipper (2008–present)
 Peugeot Partner (2008-2018)
 Saab 9-3 (2008-2012)
 Volvo XC60 (2008-2017)

2009
 Aston Martin DBS Volante (2009-2012)
 Aston Martin One-77 (2009-2012)
 Aston Martin V12 Vantage (2009-2012)
 Audi R8 Coupé 5.2 FSI quattro (2009-2012)
 Audi TT RS (2009-2015)
 Bugatti Veyron Grand Sport (2009-2015)
 Jaguar XFR (2009-2015)
 Koenigsegg CCXR Trevita (2009-2010) 
 Lamborghini Gallardo LP 550-2 Valentino Balboni (2009-2011)
 Lamborghini Murciélago LP 650-4 Roadster (2009)
 Lamborghini Murciélago LP 670-4 SuperVeloce (2009-2010)
 Lotus Evora (2009–present)
 Maserati GranTurismo MC (2009-2010)
 Maserati GranTurismo MC Sport Line (2009-2019)
 Pagani Zonda Cinque (2009)
 Pagani Zonda Cinque Roadster (2009)
 Pagani Zonda R (2009-2011)
 Peugeot iOn (2009–present)
 Peugeot 107 (2009-2012)
 Peugeot 206+ (2009-2012)
 Peugeot 5008 (2009-2016)
 Peugeot RCZ (2009-2015)
 Porsche 997 (2009-2012)
 Porsche Panamera G1 (2009-2016)
 Saab 9-5 YS3G (2009-2011)
 Zenvo ST1 (2009-2016)

2010
 Aston Martin DBS UB-2010 (2010)
 Aston Martin DBS V12 Carbon Black (2010)
 Aston Martin Rapide (2010-2013)
 Audi A1 8X (2010-2018)
 Audi A7 4G8 (2010-2017)
 Audi A8 D4 (2010-2017)
 Audi Q7 (2010-2015)
 Audi R8 GT (2010-2013)
 Audi R8 Spyder 5.2 FSI quattro (2010-2012)
 Audi RS5 (2010-2015)
 Bugatti Veyron Super Sport (2010-2011)
 Jaguar XF Supercharged (2010-2015)
 Jaguar XJ (X351) (2010-2019)
 Lamborghini Gallardo LP 570-4 Superleggera (2010-2013)
 Lamborghini Gallardo LP 550-2 (2010-2013)
 Maserati GranCabrio (2010-2019)
 Pagani Zonda Tricolore (2010)
 Peugeot 508 (2010-2018)
 Porsche Cayenne 92A (2010-2017)
 Volvo S60 (2010-2018)
 Volvo V60 (2010-2018)

2011
 Aston Martin Cygnet (2011-2013)
 Aston Martin DBS Carbon Edition (2011-2012)
 Aston Martin V8 Vantage (2011-2017)
 Aston Martin Virage (2011-2012)
 Audi A6 C7 (2011-2018)
 Audi Q3 (2011-2013)
 Audi R8 Spyder 4.2 FSI quattro (2011-2012)
 Audi RS 3 Sportback (2011-2012)
 Iveco Daily (2011-2014)
 Jaguar XF (2011-2015)
 Jaguar XK (2011-2014)
 Jaguar XKR-S (2011)
 Koenigsegg Agera R (2011-2014)
 Lamborghini Aventador LP 700-4 (2011-2016)
 Lancia Voyager (2011-2015)
 Lancia Ypsilon 846 (2011–present)
 Lotus Elise Series 3 (2011–present)
 Maserati GranCabrio Fendi (2011)
 Maserati GranCabrio Sport (2011-2019)
 Maserati GranTurismo MC Stradale (2011-2019)
 McLaren 12C (2011-2014)
 Peugeot 308 T7 (2011-2013)
 Porsche 991 (2011-2016)

2012
 Aston Martin One-77 Q-Series (2012)
 Aston Martin V12 Zagato (2012)
 Aston Martin Vanquish (2012-2018)
 Aston Martin DBS Volante Dragon 88 (2012)
 Audi A3 AV (2012–present)
 Audi A4 B8 (2012-2016)
 Audi RS 4 B8 (2012-2015)
 Audi S6 C7 (2012-2018)
 Audi S7 (2012-2017)
 Audi S8 D4 (2012-2013)
 Bugatti Veyron Grand Sport Vitesse (2012-2015)
 Jaguar XF Sportbrake (2012-2015)
 Jaguar XFR-S (2012)
 Lotus Exige S V6 (2012-2015)
 Maserati GranTurismo Sport (2012-2019)
 Maserati Quattroporte VI (2012–present)
 Pagani Huayra (2012-2018)
 Peugeot 107 (2012-2014)
 Peugeot 208 (2012–2019)
 Peugeot 301 (2012-2017)
 Peugeot 4008 (2012-2017)
 Porsche 981 Boxster (2012-2016)
 Volvo V40 (2012-2019)

2013
 Aston Martin DB9 (2013-2016)
 Aston Martin Rapide S (2013-2020)
 Aston Martin V12 Vantage S (2013-2018)
 Aston Martin Vanquish Volante (2013-2018)
 Audi A3 Cabrio (2013–present)
 Audi A3 Sedan (2013–present)
 Audi A3 Sportback (2013–present)
 Audi A3 S-line Final Edition (2013)
 Audi RS Q3 (2013-2016)
 Audi S3 (2013–present)
 Audi S5 B8.5 (2013-2017)
 Audi SQ5 TDi (2013-2018)
 Audi RS 6 C7 (2013-2018)
 Audi RS 7 (2013-2017)
 Audi S8 D4 (2013-2018)
 Jaguar F-Type (2013–present)
 Koenigsegg Agera S (2013-2014)
 Lamborghini Aventador LP 700-4 Roadster (2013-2016)
 Lamborghini Aventador LP 720-4 50° Anniversario (2013)
 Lamborghini Veneno (2013-2014)
 Lotus Exige S V6 Roadster (2013-2016)
 Maserati Ghibli (M157) (2013–present)
 Maserati GranCabrio MC (2013-2019)
 McLaren P1 (2013-2015)
 Peugeot 308 T9 (2013–2021)
 Peugeot 2008 (2013–2019)
 Porsche 918 Spyder (2013-2015)
 Porsche 991 GT3 (2013–2017)
 Porsche Cayman 981 (2013-2016)
 Rimac Concept One (2013-2014)
 Saab 9-3 Aero MY14 (2013-2014)

2014
 Audi Q3 (2014-2017)
 Audi TT FV (2014–present)
 Iveco Daily (2014–present)
 Jaguar Lightweight E-Type (2014-2015)
 Koenigsegg One:1 (2014-2016)
 Lamborghini Huracán (2014–2019)
 McLaren 650S (2014-2017)
 Peugeot 108 (2014–present)
 Porsche Macan (2014–present)

2015
 Aston Martin Vantage GT12 (2015-2016)
 Aston Martin Vulcan (2015-2016)
 Audi A4 B9 (2015–present)
 Audi Q7 4M (2015–present) 
 Audi RS 3 (2015–present)
 Audi RS Q3 (2015-2016)
 Audi R8 4S (2015–present)
 Jaguar XE (2015–present)
 Jaguar XF (2015–present)
 Koenigsegg Agera RS (2015-2018)
 Lagonda Taraf (2015-2016)
 Lamborghini Aventador LP 750-4 SuperVeloce (2015-2017)
 Lamborghini Aventador LP 740-4 S (2016–present)
 Lamborghini Centenario (2016-2017)
 Lotus 3-Eleven (2015–present)
 McLaren 540C (2015–present)
 McLaren 570GT (2015–present)
 McLaren 570S (2015–present)
 McLaren 625C (2015-2016)
 McLaren 650S Can-Am (2015-2016)
 McLaren 650S Le Mans (2015-2016)
 McLaren 675LT (2015-2016)
 Ultima Evolution (2015–present)
 Volvo XC90 (2015–present)

2016
 Aston Martin DB11 V12 (2016–present)
 Audi A5 B9 (2016–present)
 Audi Q2 (2016–present)
 Audi TT RS (2016–present)
 Bugatti Chiron (2016–present)
 Citroën Jumpy Mk3 (2016–present)
 Jaguar F-Pace (2016–present)
 Jaguar F-Type SVR (2016–present)
 Jaguar XKSS (2016-2017)
 Koenigsegg Agera Final Edition (2016-2018)
 Koenigsegg Regera (2016–present)
 Maserati Levante (2016–present)
 Peugeot 3008 II (2016–present)
 Porsche 982 Boxster (2016–present)
 Porsche 991.2 (2016-2019)
 Porsche Panamera G2 (2016–present)
 Volvo S90 (2016–present)
 Volvo V90 (2016–present)
 Zenvo TS1 GT (2016–present)
 Zenvo TSR (2016–present)

2017
 Aston Martin DB11 V8 (2017–present)
 Aston Martin Vanquish S (2017-2018)
 Aston Martin Vantage AMR Pro (2017)
 Aston Martin Vantage GT8 (2017)
 Audi A8 (2017–present)
 Audi Q5 (2017–present)
 Audi S4 (2017–present)
 Audi S5 B9 (2017–present)
 Jaguar E-Pace (2017–present)
 McLaren 720S (2017–present)
 Pagani Huayra BC (2017-2019)
 Pagani Huayra Roadster (2017-2019)
 Pagani Zonda HP Barchetta (2017)
 Peugeot 301 (2017–present)
 Peugeot 5008 (2017–present)
 Porsche Cayenne PO536 (2017–present)
 Porsche Cayman 982 (2017–present)
 Volvo XC60 (2017–present)

2018
 Aston Martin Cygnet V8 Edition (2018)
 Aston Martin DB11 AMR (2018–present)
 Aston Martin Vantage (2018–present)
 Aston Martin DB11 Volante (2018–present)
 Aston Martin DBS Superleggera (2018–present)
 Audi A1 GB (2018–present)
 Audi A6 C8 (2018–present)
 Audi A7 4G9 (2018–present)
 Audi Q3 (2018–present)
 Audi RS 4 B9 (2018–present)
 Bugatti Chiron Sport (2018–present)
 Bugatti Divo (2018–present)
 Citroën Berlingo III (2018–present)
 Jaguar I-Pace (2018–present)
 Lamborghini Aventador LP 770-4 SVJ (2018–present)
 Lamborghini Urus (2018–present)
 McLaren 600LT (2018–present)
 McLaren Senna (2018–present)
 Peugeot 508 (2018–present)
 Peugeot Rifter (2018–present)
 Porsche 991 GT2 RS (2018–present)
 Volvo S60 (2018–present)
 Volvo V60 (2018–present)
 Volvo XC40 (2018–present)
 Zenvo TSR-S (2018–present)

2019
 Aston Martin DBS Superleggera Volante (2019–present)
 Aston Martin Rapide AMR (2019–present)
 Aston Martin RapidE (2019–present)
 Aston Martin Valkyrie (2019-2020)
 Audi S8 (2019-2020)
 Lamborghini Huracán (2019–present)
 McLaren 620R (2019–present)
 McLaren GT (2019–present)
 Pagani Huayra BC Roadster (2019-2020)
 Peugeot 208 (2019–present)
 Peugeot 2008 (2019–present)
 Porsche 992 (2019–present)
 Rimac C Two (2019-2020)

2020
 Aston Martin DBX (2020–present)
 Bugatti Centodieci (2020–present)
 Jaguar Electric XJ (2020–present)
 Koenigsegg Gemera (2020)
 Koenigsegg Jesko (2020–present)
 Lotus Evija (2020–present)
 Maserati Alfieri (2020)
 Maserati MC20 (2020)
 McLaren 765LT (2020–present)
 McLaren Elva (2020–present)
 McLaren Speedtail (2020–present)
 Porsche Taycan (2020–present)
 TVR Griffith (2020–present)

2021
 Aston Martin Valhalla (2021)
 Bugatti Bolide (2021)
 Peugeot 308 III (2021)
Rimac Nevera (2021)

References

History of the automobile